El Planeta is an American-Spanish absurdist comedy film directed and written by Amalia Ulman. The film stars Amalia Ulman, Ale Ulman (Amalia's real-life mother), Nacho Vigalondo, Zhou Chen and Saoirse Bertram.

The film had its world premiere at the 2021 Sundance Film Festival on January 30, 2021.

Plot
An absurdist comedy, the film centers on the story of a mother and daughter facing eviction in post-crisis Spain and scamming their way to a more comfortable lifestyle. The film is loosely based on the real-life Spanish mother-daughter petty-crime duo Justina and Ana Belén.

Cast
The cast includes:
 Amalia Ulman as Leonor Jimenez
 Ale Ulman as María Rendueles
 Nacho Vigalondo as Older Man 
 Zhou Chen as Younger Man
 Saoirse Bertram as Fashion Editor

Production
Ulman wrote, produced, and directed the feature, which stars herself and her mother in the latter's debut performance on the silver screen.  The film was shot in black and white in Gijon, the Spanish town where Ulman grew up.

Release
The film had its premiere in the 2021 Sundance Film Festival on January 30, 2021 in the World Cinema Dramatic Competition section.

On March 17, 2021, Utopia acquired the US distribution rights to the film. On July 16, 2021, Static Vision announced their acquisition of the Australian and New Zealand rights to the film.

The film was selected for screening at the Brisbane International Film Festival and the Sydney Film Festival in October and November 2021 respectively. The film was also selected to screen at the 2021 edition of the Melbourne International Film Festival, before the in-person element of the festival was cancelled.

Reception
 review aggregator website Rotten Tomatoes surveyed  and, categorizing the reviews as positive or negative, assessed 39 as positive and 2 as negative for a 95% certified fresh rating. Among the reviews, it determined an average rating of 7.5 out of 10.

It won critical acclaim at its Sundance screening.

Accolades
El Planeta has been nominated for and won a number of awards. Wins have included:
Buenos Aires International Festival of Independent Cinema: Best Director, FEISAL Award
Galway Film Fleadh: Peripheral Visions Award
Jerusalem Film Festival: Best International Debut
Oak Cliff Film Festival: Best Narrative Feature
Toulouse Cinespaña: Winner, Best Screenplay

References

External links
 
 

Spanish comedy films
American comedy films
2021 comedy films
2020s American films